Joseph O'Neal Christopher (born December 13, 1935) is a former professional baseball outfielder, who played in Major League Baseball (MLB) from  through . Listed at 5' 10", 175 lbs., he batted and threw right-handed.

Christopher reached the big leagues with the 1959 Pittsburgh Pirates, spending three years there before moving to the New York Mets (1962–65) and Boston Red Sox (1966). 
 
While in Pittsburgh, Christopher was used as a backup in all three outfield positions for Bob Skinner (LF), Bill Virdon (CF), and Roberto Clemente (RF). Christopher was first called up when Clemente was injured, making his debut in nothing less than Harvey Haddix's near-perfect game, on May 26, 1959. As a member of the 1960 World Series Champion Pirates, Christopher was a utility player, pinch-running in three games and scoring two runs (in games 2 and 5).

Christopher became the Mets’ fifth pick in the 1961 MLB Expansion Draft. In 1964, he enjoyed easily his finest season as a major-leaguer, hitting .300, with 16 home runs, 76 runs batted in (RBI), 78 runs, 163 hits, 26 doubles, and eight triples, in 154 games — all career-highs. Christopher had a career-best day on August 19, collecting two triples, a double, and a home run in an 8–6 victory over his former Pirates teammates. Then, on September 25, he broke up the no-hit bid of Cincinnati Reds pitcher Jim Maloney at Shea Stadium. Christopher‘s second-inning single was the only hit against Maloney, who had to settle for a 3–0 shutout.

Christopher played briefly in 1966 for the Red Sox and was dealt with pitcher Earl Wilson to the Detroit Tigers, who sent Julio Navarro as part of the package. Although Christopher’s major league career had come to an end on June 9, 1966 (he never played for Detroit), he stayed active in the minors through 1968. Christopher also played winter baseball in the Dominican Republic, Mexico, and Puerto Rico.

In an eight-season MLB career, Christopher was a .260 hitter, with 29 home runs, and 173 RBI, in 638 games, including one five-hit game and eight four-hit games.

See also
List of players from Virgin Islands in Major League Baseball

External links
, or Baseball Biography, or Retrosheet, or Pura Pelota (Venezuelan Winter League)
Artistic Work article
Virgin Islands Baseball

1935 births
Living people
African-American baseball players
Boston Red Sox players
Buffalo Bisons (minor league) players
Columbus Jets players
Lincoln Chiefs players
Major League Baseball outfielders
Major League Baseball players from the United States Virgin Islands
Navegantes del Magallanes players
Expatriate baseball players in Venezuela
New York Mets players
People from Saint Croix, U.S. Virgin Islands
Phoenix Stars players
Pittsburgh Pirates players
Reading Phillies players
Richmond Braves players
Salt Lake City Bees players
Syracuse Chiefs players
Tigres del México players
Tulsa Oilers (baseball) players
Williamsport Grays players
United States Virgin Islands expatriate baseball players in Mexico
21st-century African-American people
20th-century African-American sportspeople